Pyrgus scriptura, the small checkered skipper, is a species of skipper (family Hesperiidae). It is found from the Texas to Montana, southeastern Alberta, and southwestern Saskatchewan.

The wingspan is 16–22 mm. There are two generations from May to August.

The larva feed  Malvaceae spp. and Sida hederacea.

Subspecies
Pyrgus scriptura scriptura
Pyrgus scriptur apertorum Austin, 1998

References

External links
Small checkered skipper, Butterflies and Moths of North America
Small checkered skipper, BugGuide
Pyrgus, funet.fi

Pyrgus
Butterflies of North America
Butterflies described in 1852